Carex contracta is a tussock-forming species of perennial sedge in the family Cyperaceae. It is native to parts of New South Wales.

See also
List of Carex species

References

contracta
Taxa named by Ferdinand von Mueller
Plants described in 1874
Flora of New South Wales